, lit. Shrine Bridge, also known as Harajuku Bridge or Harajuku Cosplay Bridge, is a bridge that passes over the Yamanote Line between Harajuku Station and the entrance to the Meiji Shrine in Tokyo, Japan. Formerly a pedestrian bridge, it is now open to traffic. With its wide pedestrian area, it is well known as a spot for cosplayers and fashion performers, which in turn led to it becoming a tourist attraction.

History and technical specifications
Jingūbashi is a -long, -wide bridge made out of reinforced concrete. It dates from 1982, when it replaced the original bridge that had opened in September 1920. The original bridge was one of the first reinforced concrete bridges in Japan. The current bridge inherits the design and some of the elements of the original bridge, such as the ornamental railing pillars.

Cultural significance
The Harajuku area is known internationally as a center of Japanese youth culture and fashion. Jingu Bridge has become one of the locality's popular landmarks. Since the 1960s, it has attracted numerous cosplayers, performers, people dressed in visual kei, lolita fashion (sometimes in gothic variations), or similar outfits, and tourists.

The area was pedestrian-only and closed to motor-vehicles until 1995; the opening of the area to motor vehicles has been credited with lessening the popularity of the area. Jingu Bridge itself has become somewhat less popular in the second decade of the 21st century, with a 2017 CNN guide suggesting that "it's been noted that Harajuku Girls no longer gather in large numbers on Jingu Bridge ... these days".

Gallery

References

External links 
 

Harajuku
Bridges in Tokyo
Tourist attractions in Tokyo
Cosplay
Japanese fashion